Kotli Khurd is a village in the Mandi Bahauddin District of the Punjab province of Pakistan. It is situated 28 km south east of the district capital - Mandi Bahauddin and 12 km east of the town of Phalia. The population of Kotli Khurd is about 1000. The literacy rate is above 35%. The village is well cultivated area the main crops are wheat rice and sugar cane, most people are farmers and government servants. The village has been developing since the 1947 division. Khurd and Kalan Persian language word which means small and Big respectively when two villages have same name then it is distinguished as Kalan means Big and Khurd means Small with Village Name.

References

Villages in Phalia Tehsil
Villages in Mandi Bahauddin District